Centreville, Centerville, Centre-ville or Centre-Ville and variants may refer to:

Places

Canada
 Centreville, British Columbia, a ghost town
 Centreville, New Brunswick, a village in Carleton County
 Centreville, Newfoundland and Labrador
 Centreville, Nova Scotia (disambiguation)
 Centreville, Elgin County, Ontario (now known as West Elgin)
 Centreville, Grey County, Ontario
 Centreville, Lennox and Addington County, Ontario
 Centre-ville, the Central business district of any French-speaking Canadian city

United States
 Centerville, Alabama, an unincorporated community
 Centreville, Alabama, a city
 Centerville, Arkansas (disambiguation)
 Centerville, California (disambiguation)
 Centerville, Hamden, Connecticut, a neighborhood of Hamden
 Centerville, Delaware, an unincorporated community
 Centerville, Florida, an unincorporated community
 Centerville, Georgia (disambiguation)
 Centerville, Idaho, an unincorporated community
 Centerville, Illinois (disambiguation)
 Centerville, Indiana, a town
 Centerville, Spencer County, Indiana, an unincorporated community
 Centreville, Illinois, a former city
 Centerville, Iowa, a city
 Centerville, Boone County, Iowa, an unincorporated community
 Centerville, Kansas, an unincorporated community
 Centerville, Kentucky (disambiguation)
 Centerville, Louisiana (disambiguation)
 Centerville, Maine, a township
 Centreville, Maryland, a town
 Centerville, Massachusetts, a village
 Centerville River, Massachusetts
 Centreville, Michigan, a village
 Centerville Township, Michigan
 Centerville, Minnesota, a city
 Centerville, Winona County, Minnesota, an unincorporated community
 Centerville, Missouri, a city
 Centreville, Mississippi, a town
 Centerville, Montana, a census-designated place
 Centerville, Nebraska, an unincorporated community
 Centerville, Nevada, an unincorporated community
 Centerville, New Jersey (disambiguation)
 Centerville, New York, a town
 Centerville, Ulster County, New York, a community
 Centerville, North Carolina, a census-designated place
 Centerville, Ohio (disambiguation)
 Centerville, Pennsylvania (disambiguation)
 Centerville, Rhode Island, a village
 Centerville, South Carolina, a census-designated place
 Centerville, South Dakota, a city
 Centerville, Tennessee, a town
 Centerville, Texas, a city
 Centerville, Trinity County, Texas, an unincorporated community
 Centreville, Texas, a ghost town
 Centerville, Utah, a city
 Centerville, Virginia (disambiguation)
 Centerville, Washington, an unincorporated community and census-designated place
 Centerville, Washington, original name of the city of Stanwood, Washington. Changed on account of there being too many Centervilles.
 Centerville, Tyler County, West Virginia, an unincorporated community
 Centerville, Wayne County, West Virginia, an unincorporated community
 Centerville, Wisconsin (disambiguation)

Schools
 Centerville Community College, Centerville, Iowa
 Centerville High School (disambiguation)
 Centreville High School (disambiguation)

Transportation
 Centerville station, Centerville, Iowa, United States, a train station on the National Register of Historic Places
 Centerville station (Central Railroad of New Jersey), original name of a train station in Bayonne
 Terminus Centre-Ville (AMT), a bus station in Montreal, Canada

Arts and entertainment
 Centreville Amusement Park, Toronto Islands, Ontario, Canada
 Centerville, the fictional setting of 200 Motels, a movie
 "Centerville, Illinois", the fictional setting of the 1983 science fiction spoof Strange Invaders
 Centerville (1999 TV Short Series)

See also
 Centerville City (disambiguation)
 Centerville Pioneer Cemetery, Fremont, California